Gioia Denise Arismendi Lombardini , better known as Gioia Arismendi (born January 5, 1984 in Caracas) is a Venezuelan actress and model.

Biography
Arismendi grew up in a family of artists. Her mother Gioia Lombardini is an actress is familiar to Venezuelan television, her father is a publicist while her sister is a novelist. From a young age, Arismendi was interested in drama and acting. However, her father encouraged her to finish high school before she could pursue acting further. After finishing her high school studies at San Agustín Codazzi, she enrolled for a Bachelor of Arts course at Universidad Central de Venezuela.

Career beginnings
Arismendi studied acting at the Taller de Teatro Luz Columba under the instruction of professor Nelson Orteaga who is responsible for the career development of various RCTV actors. Her first television appearance was in 1992 in the telenovela Las dos Dianas. Since then, she has participated in several RCTV telenovelas such as Divina obsesión, Mis 3 Hermanas, Juana la virgen, La cuaima and Camaelona.

In 2008, she joined Venevisión to participate in the telenovela Torrente in the role of Maruja Briceño.

In 2011, she was part of the cast of the telenovela Natalia del Mar in the role of Candy.

 Telenovelas Amor Secreto (2015) – Paula GuerreroLas Bandidas (2013) – Marta RomeroNatalia del Mar (2011) – Candy RomeroTorrente (2008) – Maruja Briceño Mendizábal Por todo lo alto (2006)Amantes (2005)Juana la virgen (2002) – LiliMis 3 Hermanas (2000)Divina obsesión (1992)Las dos Dianas (1992) – Dianita niña

Theater
 Malos Entendidos'' (2014)

References

External links

1984 births
Living people
Venezuelan film actresses
Venezuelan telenovela actresses
Venezuelan female models
Actresses from Caracas